The Barbary Treaties refer to several treaties between the United States of America and the semi-autonomous North African city-states of Algiers, Tunis, and Tripoli, under the rule of the Ottoman Empire, known collectively as the Barbary States.

Treaty with Algiers (1795) 
Treaty with Tripoli (1796)
Treaty with Tunis (1797)
Treaty with Tripoli (1805)
Treaty with Algiers (1815) 
Treaty with Tunis (1824) 
Treaty with Morocco (1836)

See also
Barbary pirates
First Barbary War
Second Barbary War
Barbary Coast

Further reading
London, Joshua E.Victory in Tripoli: How America's War with the Barbary Pirates Established the U.S. Navy and Shaped a Nation New Jersey: John Wiley & Sons, Inc., 2005.

External links
Treaties with The Barbary Powers : 1786-1836 from the Avalon Project

Treaties of the United States
Barbary Wars
United States–African relations